"Growing Pains" is a song written and recorded by Canadian singer-songwriter Alessia Cara, released as the lead single for her second studio album, The Pains of Growing. Written by Cara and producers Pop & Oak, the track explores the challenges of entering adulthood. It was released to digital retailers on June 15, 2018 through Def Jam Recordings and serviced to American hot adult contemporary radio on June 25, 2018. Its official music video received a nomination for Best Cinematography at the 2018 MTV Video Music Awards.

Composition
"Growing Pains" is a pop song with influences of R&B. Lyrically, the song discusses a loss of innocence and the "inevitable struggle of growing up."

Music video
An accompanying music video directed by Alan Masferrer premiered June 20, 2018. It is set in a dystopian environment meant to represent the oppression of others' influences. Cara begins the video in an oversized shirt before being pushed around by suit- and mask-wearing adult figures and being forced into an oversized grey suit herself. Lilly Milman of Billboard wrote that the video finds Cara "navigating an obstacle course of adulthood."

Live performances

Cara debuted the song on The Tonight Show Starring Jimmy Fallon on June 18, 2018.

Track listing
Digital download
"Growing Pains" – 3:13

Digital download – Acoustic
"Growing Pains" (Acoustic) – 3:13

Digital download – Remixes
"Growing Pains" (Eden Prince Remix) – 3:33
"Growing Pains" (Toby Green Remix) – 2:55
"Growing Pains" (Alphalove Remix) – 3:32
"Growing Pains" (Dombresky Remix) – 3:27
"Growing Pains" (Justin Caruso Remix) – 3:01
"Growing Pains" (Ford Miskin Remix) – 2:36

Digital download – Remixes, Pt. 2
"Growing Pains" (Bravvo Remix) – 3:42
"Growing Pains" (The Kemist Remix) – 3:36
"Growing Pains" (Locals Only Sound Remix) (featuring Curtis Smith) – 3:15

Charts

Certifications

Release history

References

2018 songs
2018 singles
Alessia Cara songs
Def Jam Recordings singles
Song recordings produced by Pop & Oak
Songs written by Alessia Cara
Body image in popular culture
Songs written by Pop Wansel
Songs written by Oak Felder